The 1979 Gaware Paints Bombay International was a professional invitational snooker tournament held in February 1979 in Bombay (modern-day Mumbai), India. This was the first professional snooker tournament to be held in India.

Six professionals played in a round-robin format, with John Spencer emerging as the winner.

Main draw

References

1979 in snooker
1979 in Indian sport